Cleabarrow is a hamlet in Cumbria, England. It gives its name to a small tarn in the area.

References

Hamlets in Cumbria
South Lakeland District